Laurie Zaleski is an author, businesswoman, and the founder of Funny Farm Rescue & Sanctuary, a nonprofit animal rescue farm in Mays Landing, New Jersey. Her rescue center has over 600 animals living on her  farm, all of whom have been rescued from other locations. She has been honored as a New Jersey Heartland Hero and was listed in the 2019 Who’s Who of Professional Women.

In 2022, she published her memoir called Funny Farm.

Zaleski was raised by her single mom, Anne, who also rescued animals. They lived in Turnersville, New Jersey, in a shack that they moved to when Anne escaped from an abusive marriage.

Zaleski went to college and opened her own graphic design firm called Art-Z Graphics where she is the founder, president and CEO. She purchased the farm in 2000 and intended to live there together with her mom, who died two weeks before they were scheduled to move in. The farm includes 100 volunteers and has been open to the public free of charge twice a week since 2012.

References 

American women in business
American writers
Businesspeople from New Jersey
Living people
People from Washington Township, Gloucester County, New Jersey